The Calgary Underground Film Festival (CUFF) is a film festival held annually in Calgary, Alberta, Canada for 7 days at the Globe Cinema in downtown Calgary.

Founded in 2003, Calgary Underground Film Festival is a not-for-profit organization dedicated to programming films that defy convention. Through the screening of contemporary works in various categories that include: feature, documentary, animation and shorts - CUFF brings Calgarians a unique roster of films rarely seen in North American theatres. CUFF actively looks to showcase titles in all genres, from horror, sci-fi and fantasy to comedies, thrillers and music-related films. In addition to finding great films CUFF is committed to introducing audiences to the people behind the lens, by showcasing local and international indie filmmakers. The organizers are proud to contribute to Calgary's thriving arts community and are thrilled to bring innovative and challenging selections to all film enthusiasts.

CUFF currently has two annual festivals. The main Calgary Underground Film Festival runs for 7-days in mid-April; CUFF.Docs International Documentary Festival is in November. In addition, CUFF showcases special event screenings throughout the year.

Festival awards

CUFF gathers a panel of local and visiting industry professionals to choose their top picks of the festival. Additionally, at each screening CUFF audiences receive ballots to submit their own festival favourites.

Audience Award
 BEST FILM

Jury Awards
 BEST NARRATIVE FEATURE
 BEST DOCUMENTARY FEATURE
 BEST CANADIAN SHORT

12hr Halloween Movie Marathon
Since 2015, CUFF has presented an all-night Halloween Movie Marathon at The Globe Cinema in Calgary. The event runs from 7pm-7am and includes a costume contest, a pizza party and free cereal for those who make it until the morning.

48-Hour Movie Making Challenge
Until 2015, CUFF ran a 48-Hour Movie Making Challenge that gave young and emerging filmmakers an opportunity to produce a short film in 48 hours. The completed shorts were showcased at the following Calgary Underground Film Festival.

See also
List of festivals in Calgary
Festivals in Alberta

References

External links

CUFF Official Website

Film festivals in Calgary
Underground film festivals